Fauji is a 1995 Bollywood action drama film directed by Lawrence D'Souza. It stars Dharmendra, Raj Babbar, Farah in lead roles.

Cast
 Dharmendra as Fauji Shamsher Singh "Sheroo"
 Raj Babbar as Arjun Sinha
 Farah as Roopa
 Sonu Walia as Lajwanti "Lajjo"
 Amita Nangia as Tulsi / Reshma
 Poonam Dasgupta
 Sudhir Dalvi as Bansilal Sinha
 Bharat Kapoor as Thakur Karan Singh
 Raza Murad as Thakur Suryanarayan Singh
 Kiran Kumar as Daku Durjan Singh

Music

References

External links
 

1995 films
1990s Hindi-language films
Films scored by Vishal Bhardwaj
Films directed by Lawrence D'Souza
Indian action drama films